Meri Doli Mere Angana is an Indian Hindi soap opera starring Astha Abhay and Ankit Raizada. It premiered on Azaad TV on 14 September 2021. It is made under the banner of Tell-A-Tale Media. This show is also available on MX Player.

Plot 
In Bithoor, the entire Singh family, especially her father, considers the daughter an apple of their eye. But these relationships change and it drastically affects Janki.

Cast 
 Aastha Abhay as Janki
 Surendra Pal as Gyanendra Singh: Janki's father
 Dhrisha Kalyani as Sakshi Singh: Janki's sister
 Worship Khanna as Vijayendra Singh: Janki's cousin brother
 Dharmendra Gupta as Nagendra Singh: Janki's uncle
 Archana Damohe as Janki's grandmother
 Kuldeep Chaudhary as Santosh: Vijayendra's friend
 Ankit Raizada
 Dipali Sharma as Ginni
 Priyanka Malviya as Nidhi

References

External links 
 

2021 Indian television series debuts
2022 Indian television series endings
Indian television series
Indian television soap operas
Serial drama television series
Hindi-language television shows
Indian drama television series
Television shows set in Delhi